Julian Martin White MBE (born 14 May 1973) is an English Landowner, best known for his time playing professional rugby union as a prop for Leicester Tigers and England. White was regarded as an aggressive tighthead prop, one of the most powerful forwards in the game, and for his destructive scrummaging.

Biography 
White was born 14 May 1973 in Plymouth, Devon. As a child he played mini and junior rugby for Salcombe and had played in the same senior side as his father, a former Plymouth Albion player. He served his rugby union apprenticeship with Okehampton and Plymouth Albion and had a spell in New Zealand with Hawke's Bay and Canterbury Crusaders. He made his debut for Hawke's Bay in August 1996 and appeared in the NZ Provincial Championship. He made his only Super 12 appearance as a replacement for the Crusaders against Natal in Christchurch in April 1997.

His time in New Zealand ended in tragedy; he was involved in an auto accident in which a young woman was killed and he suffered a broken leg. As he remembers it,

He returned to the UK when a Welsh coach who had worked with White at Hawke's Bay told him that Bridgend desperately needed a tighthead. White played for Bridgend in 1998/9 before moving to Saracens in 1999. He swiftly made his Premiership debut in the 28–23 defeat of London Irish at Vicarage Road, Watford on the opening weekend of the season.

White made his England debut against South Africa on England's Summer 2000 tour there. He appeared in his first Twickenham Test against Argentina in November 2001, playing until half time when he was replaced by Phil Vickery.

He toured North America in the summer of 2001, forming a solid front row with Graham Rowntree and Dorian West.

At the start of the 2001–02 season he transferred back to the West Country with Bristol Shoguns. This occurred after a protracted affair where White had attempted to get out of the contract he had signed with Bristol. White did not endear himself to Bristol supporters as he had tried to break out of his contract to join bitter local rivals Bath. In the event, White did become a Bristol player. Along with teammate Daryl Gibson, he joined Leicester Tigers for the 2003–04 season after Bristol were relegated. Replacing the retiring Darren Garforth, his Leicester debut was held over as he was in Australia on duty with England at the 2003 Rugby Union World Cup.

During the World Cup he was in the starting line up against Samoa and came on as a replacement against Uruguay. As part of the victorious squad White earned himself an MBE.

In 2004 White took the opportunity to demonstrate his scrummaging skills in the England front row during the 6 Nations and the summer tour to the Southern Hemisphere.

He was one of the players named in the 2005 British & Irish Lions squad to tour New Zealand, and started in all three tests.

Prior to the 2007 Rugby Union World Cup, White made himself unavailable for selection and did not feature in another England game. In January 2009, it was announced that he had been selected for the England Saxons squad. Later that year, following the suspension of Matt Stevens, he was called up to the full England squad as a replacement.

White was part of the Leicester squads that won the 2007 and 2009 Premiership finals.

Personal life
White met his Welsh wife, Sara, in a Cardiff bar in 2004, when he was by his own admission drunk. The couple have two daughters.

References

External links 
 England profile
 sporting heroes
 Profile at Leicester Tigers

1973 births
Living people
Bristol Bears players
England international rugby union players
English rugby union players
Leicester Tigers players
Members of the Order of the British Empire
Rugby union players from Plymouth, Devon
Plymouth Albion R.F.C. players
Rugby union props
Saracens F.C. players
British & Irish Lions rugby union players from England